Aikaterini Kaloudi (also known as Katerina Kaloudi, born 19 September 1974) is a Greek sailor. She competed in the women's 470 event at the 1996 Summer Olympics.

References

External links
 
 

1974 births
Living people
Greek female sailors (sport)
Olympic sailors of Greece
Sailors at the 1996 Summer Olympics – 470
Place of birth missing (living people)